The Richter Brewery, also known as the Delta Building, is a commercial building located at 1615 Ludington Street in Escanaba, Michigan.  It was listed on the National Register of Historic Places in 2009.

History
The Richter Brewing Company was organized in Escanaba in 1901. The company immediately hired a Milwaukee firm to design the building. Construction of the Richter Brewery proceeded from 1900 into 1901, and the Richter Brewery began manufacture in early 1901.  Building and equipping the brewery cost $40,000. It was the second brewery in Escanaba. Over the next few years, additional buildings were constructed, including a keg house, office building, bottling plant, ice house and stable.  All but the 1915 office building were demolished in 1929.  The brewery closed at the beginning of Prohibition, and it was sold in 1925.  The building was then used to manufacture non-alcoholic beverages. At the end of Prohibition, it was sold to the Delta Brewery Company.  The building was again used to brew beer until the Delta Brewing Company went bankrupt in 1940.

The building remained vacant until the late 2000s. The building was purchased in 2008 with the intention of renovating it into loft apartment space; it was split into fifteen loft apartments and three ground-floor commercial spaces.  As of early 2012, the renovation was nearly complete, with 9 apartments leased and one of the three commercial spaces filled.

Description

The building has corner towers and round-head windows.

References

External links

Lofts on Ludington, the Richter Brewery's current incarnation.

Industrial buildings and structures on the National Register of Historic Places in Michigan
Victorian architecture in Michigan
Industrial buildings completed in 1900
Brewery buildings in the United States
Buildings and structures in Delta County, Michigan
National Register of Historic Places in Delta County, Michigan